The 2017 All-Ireland Senior Camogie Championship Final, the 86th event of its kind and the culmination of the 2017 All-Ireland Senior Camogie Championship, was played at Croke Park in Dublin on 10 September 2017.

Details

References

1
All-Ireland Senior Camogie Championship Finals
All-Ireland Senior Camogie Championship Final
All-Ireland Senior Camogie Championship Final, 2017
Cork county camogie team matches
Kilkenny county camogie team matches